Tambogo, also known as Tambogo I and II, is a commune in the Andemtenga Department of Kouritenga Province in the Centre-Est region of Burkina Faso. It had a population of 2,403 in 2006.

The town contains a school, Tambogo Primary School, which opened on 1 October 1986. It also contains a private pharmacy, WEDA Wendyam Cathérine, which opened in 2011.

Demographics

Neighbourhoods

Notes 

Populated places in the Centre-Est Region